Heinz Alex Natan (1 February 1906 - 14 January 1971) was a German-Jewish sprinter, sports writer and political activist  described by Alfred Flechtheim as the "fastest Jew in Germany". He was a member of the bürgerlich sports movement and ran for SC Charlottenburg Berlin.

Selected publications
 Silver renaissance: essays in eighteenth-century English history
 Swiss men of letters: twelve literary essays
 German men of letters: twelve literary essays
 Sport and society: a symposium 
 Primadonna: Lob der Stimmen
 Britain today
 Primo uomo: grosse Sänger der Oper 
 Richard Strauss: die Opern

References 

1906 births
1971 deaths
20th-century German Jews
German athletes
Jewish athletes (track and field)
German sports journalists
German writers about music